Burkhardt Historic District is located in Chesterfield, Missouri.  The original listing on the National Register of Historic Places occurred in 2000, and included the properties from 16662-16678 Chesterfield Airport Road.  A boundary increase in 2006 added the even numbered properties only, from 16626-16660 Chesterfield Airport Road.  Architecture in the combined district includes Bungalow/Craftsman and Late Victorian styles.

References

Historic districts on the National Register of Historic Places in Missouri
National Register of Historic Places in St. Louis County, Missouri